"Tea Party" is a song by Estonian singer Kerli. It is featured on the album Almost Alice, a multi-artist compilation album which features music inspired by the 2010 film Alice in Wonderland released on March 2, 2010.

"Tea Party" was released as a single from the Almost Alice soundtrack through a maxi single featuring the song and six remixes that was released digitally on June 15, 2010.

The music video, which is directed by Justin Harder, premiered on March 10, 2010.

Composition 
Kerli stated she wanted to create something "psychedelic [and] twisted" and inspired by the Alice in Wonderland film.

Release 
Kerli stated it was intended that the song would never see its proper release as a single as she feels her upcoming second studio album is better and she "didn't want the label to fully go with something like 'Tea Party' as a single and then not push all the other stuff if 'Tea Party' didn't do everything they needed it to." However, a remix single was given a digital release on June 15, 2010.

Critical reception 
USA Today gave "Tea Party" a positive review while criticizing the Almost Alice album as a whole, citing it as "curiously meek" and stating the album lacked an Alice in Wonderland theme with the exception of "Tea Party": a "bouncy, innuendo-packed slice of dance pop that will have parents wondering how it slipped past Disney censors."

About.com opined that the track "meld[s] the styles of Avril Lavigne and Lady Gaga for an energetic electro-pop number that seems uncharacteristic for her, despite how much fun it is."

The Houston Chronicle gave Almost Alice a negative review along with "Tea Party", saying the song could have "benefited from a more adventurous arrangement".

Music video 

The music video is directed by Justin Harder and debuted on March 10, 2010. It features Kerli throwing a lavish tea party with her guests in abstract make-up and costumes. It is revealed towards the end Kerli added a potion to the tea which causes the guests to turn into dolls which she collects and places on a shelf.

Live performances 
Kerli performed "Tea Party", "Walking on Air" and "Strange" at the Alice in Wonderland Ultimate Fan Event at the Hollywood and Highland Center on February 19, 2010. The performance was a promotion of the Alice in Wonderland film and its soundtrack.

On May 26, 2010, Kerli performed "Tea Party" at the opening night of the Fashion Institute of Design & Merchandising exhibit for Walt Disney Studios in Los Angeles, California.

Track listing 
Digital maxi single
"Tea Party" – 3:28
"Tea Party" (Jason Nevins Radio Remix) – 3:12
"Tea Party" (Jason Nevins Extended Remix) – 5:55
"Tea Party" (Jason Nevins Extended Instrumental) – 5:55
"Tea Party" (Chew Espresso Fix) – 3:49
"Tea Party" (Chew Espresso Fix Extended) – 5:55
"Tea Party" (Chew Espresso Fix Extended Instrumental) – 5:55

References

External links 
 

2010 singles
Kerli songs
Music based on Alice in Wonderland
Songs written by Kerli
Walt Disney Records singles
Alice in Wonderland (franchise)
2010 songs